Lee Chung-wei (born 14 December 1952) is a Taiwanese politician and naval Vice Admiral. He is the acting Chairperson of Ocean Affairs Council since 14 January 2019.

Education
Lee received his bachelor's degree from the Republic of China Naval Academy in 1975 and completed further studies at the National Defense University in the Naval Command and Staff College and the War College in 1987 and 1989, respectively.

Political careers
Lee was appointed as the Minister of the Coast Guard Administration on 20 May 2016. On 28 April 2018, the Ocean Affairs Council was established and the Coast Guard Administration was placed under it. Lee was then appointed as the Deputy Chairperson of the council.

See also
 Executive Yuan

References

1952 births
Political office-holders in the Republic of China on Taiwan
Living people